WNW may stand for:
 West-northwest, a compass point
 West Norwood railway station, London, National Rail station code WNW
 Wideband Networking Waveform, a military radio protocol